Lavra Babič (born 1 January 1987 in Brezje) is a freestyle swimmer from Slovenia, who participated for her native country at the 2004 Summer Olympics in Athens, Greece.

References
Slovenian Swimming Federation
sports-reference

1987 births
Living people
Slovenian female freestyle swimmers
Slovenian female swimmers
Olympic swimmers of Slovenia
Swimmers at the 2004 Summer Olympics
People from the City Municipality of Novo Mesto